Osano is a surname. Notable people with the surname include:

 Curtis Osano (born 1987), Kenyan footballer
 Jacob Osano (born 1994), Kenyan footballer
 Thomas Osano (born 1970), Kenyan long-distance runner

Surnames of Kenyan origin